Cochlespira kuroharai is a species of sea snail, a marine gastropod mollusk in the family Cochlespiridae, the turrids.

Description
The length of the shell attains 31 mm, its width 11.2 mm and contains 10 whorls. The elongate fusiform spire is rather broadly conical with a prominent granulose basal keel and a heavier, rounded peripheral keel above one third of the height of the whorl. The siphonal canal is long and straight.

Distribution
This species occurs in the Pacific Ocean off Japan and the Philippines.

References

External links
 Specimen at the MNHN, Paris

Kuroharai